Kantharodai Tamil Kandaiya Vidyasalai is a provincial school in Kandarodai, Jaffna District, Sri Lanka.

See also
 List of schools in Northern Province, Sri Lanka
 Skandavarodaya College

References

External link

Provincial schools in Sri Lanka
Schools in Jaffna District